Bronisława Kowalska (5 December 1955 – 26 December 2020) was a Polish politician.

Biography
Born in Starachowice, Poland, she served as a Deputy from 1993 to 2005 and as a MEP in 2004. She was a member of the Democratic Left Alliance.

Kowalska, who had leukemia, died from COVID-19 in Kielce amid the COVID-19 pandemic in Poland, 21 days after her 65th birthday.

References

1955 births
2020 deaths
Women members of the Sejm of the Republic of Poland
Members of the Polish Sejm 1993–1997
Members of the Polish Sejm 1997–2001
Members of the Polish Sejm 2001–2005
Women MEPs for Poland
MEPs for Poland 2004
20th-century Polish women politicians
21st-century Polish women politicians
Deaths from the COVID-19 pandemic in Poland
Polish schoolteachers
People from Starachowice
Democratic Left Alliance politicians